The McPlant is a vegetarian (but not always vegan) burger sold by the fast-food chain McDonald's in several European countries. In 2021, McDonald's partnered with Beyond Meat, a Los Angeles–based producer of plant-based meat substitutes, to create the McPlant platform. It features a plant-based meat alternative burger patty made from plant ingredients such as potatoes, peas and rice.

The McPlant was launched in the United Kingdom in January 2022, after tests in October 2021. It is also available in Ireland. In both the United Kingdom and Ireland, the burger is vegan due to the use of vegan sandwich sauce and a vegan cheese alternative. The McPlant is also sold in a non-vegan variant (with cheese and egg-based mayonnaise) in Austria, Germany, and Portugal, as well as in the Netherlands with cheese and a vegan sandwich sauce. When the (non-vegan) McPlant was launched in Germany in February 2023, it replaced the Fresh Vegan TS burger, leading to some criticism from customers.

In January 2023, McDonald's launched the Double McPlant with two patties in the United Kingdom and Ireland. In Austria, McDonald's also sells the McPlant Steakhouse, a variant of the burger with steakhouse sauce. In Germany, it also sells McPlant Nuggets made from wheat and pea protein.

In several other countries, the McPlant was tested but not introduced in the permanent menu. The first tests occurred in Sweden and Denmark between January and April 2021. In the United States, the product was initially tested in November 2021, with expanded tests in California and Texas from February 2022. The trial run of the McPlant in the United States was cancelled in August 2022, reportedly due to low sales. From July until November 2022, the McPlant was served in Victoria, Australia, as a limited run item.

See also 
 McVeggie
 McVegan
 Impossible Whopper

References 

McDonald's
Meat substitutes